Ernest Milmore Stires (May 20, 1866 - February 12, 1951) was the third Bishop of Long Island in the  Episcopal Church from 1925 to 1942.

Early life and education
Stires was born in Norfolk, Virginia on May 20, 1866, son of Van Rensselaer West Stires and Lettie M. Milmore. He was a graduate of the Episcopal High School in Alexandria, Virginia, Virginia Theological Seminary, and the University of Virginia where he was a member of Phi Kappa Psi and the Virginia Glee Club. Stires later served as Phi Kappa Psi's seventh national President. He graduated with a Bachelor of Letters from the University of Virginia in 1888. He was awarded a Doctor of Divinity from Virginia Theological Seminary in 1901, Doctor of Humane Letters from Kenyon College in 1903, Doctor of Laws from New York University, Doctor of Civil Law from University of King's College and Doctor of Sacred Theology from Columbia University, all in 1926.

Ordained Ministry
He was ordained deacon on June 26, 1891 by the Bishop of Virginia Francis McNeece Whittle, and then served as rector of St John's Church in West Point, Virginia. He was ordained priest on June 24, 1892 by the Bishop of Southern Virginia Alfred Magill Randolph, and briefly served in the Church of the Good Shepherd in Augusta, Georgia before moving to Chicago to serve as curate and then rector of Grace Church in 1893. On November 1, 1901, he became rector of St Thomas's Church in New York City where he served until 1925 with a brief absence for when he served in France in the First World War. He served as deputy to the General Convention from 1910 to 1925 and was a member of National Council.

Episcopacy
Stires was elected Coadjutor Bishop of Long Island in May 1925. However, by the time of his consecration, the incumbent diocesan bishop, Frederick Burgess, had died, and hence Stires was consecrated as the third Bishop of Long Island on November 24, 1925 by Presiding Bishop Ethelbert Talbot.

References

External links
 Bibliographic directory from Project Canterbury

1866 births
1951 deaths
People from Norfolk, Virginia
Episcopal High School (Alexandria, Virginia) alumni
Virginia Theological Seminary alumni
University of Virginia alumni
Phi Kappa Psi
Episcopal bishops of Long Island
Burials at Kensico Cemetery